Subodh Kumar Jaiswal (born 22 September 1962) is an Indian police officer who is currently serving as the director of Central Bureau of Investigation (CBI). He is a 1985 batch Indian Police Service (IPS) officer and former Director General of Police, Maharashtra. He was previously the police commissioner of Mumbai, the largest city in India and the seventh most populous city in the world. Jaiswal was with the Research and Analysis Wing (R&AW), India's external intelligence agency for nine years, during which he served as the additional secretary of R&AW for three years. Jaiswal has also served in Intelligence Bureau and Maharashtra ATS Chief. He was the head of the Central Industrial Security Force. Jaiswal's career began in 1985 as a trainee officer in Aurangabad, where he was subsequently assigned the full posting as the Assistant Commissioner of Police.

References 

Indian police officers
1962 births
Living people
Directors of the Central Bureau of Investigation